The 1953 Utah Redskins football team was an American football team that represented the University of Utah as a member of the Skyline Conference during the 1953 college football season. In their fourth season under head coach Jack Curtice, the Redskins compiled an overall record of 8–2 with a mark of 5–0 against conference opponents, winning Skyline title for the third consecutive year.

Utah played its first nationally televised game in the final game of the season, on November 26. NBC Sports televised 12 games during the season, making the BYU–Utah rivalry game played on Thanksgiving Day among the first nationally broadcast college football games. Utah was 7–2, had clinched their third consecutive Skyline Conference title the previous week, and BYU had won only twice. Utah was heavily favored to win the game, by up to 24 points. BYU played tough, though, and Utah prevailed by one point, 33–32.

Schedule

NFL Draft
Four Utah players were selected in the 1954 NFL Draft.

References

External links
 Official game program: Idaho at Utah – September 26, 1953

Utah
Utah Utes football seasons
Mountain States Conference football champion seasons
Utah Redskins football